The West Donegal Railway (WDR) was a  narrow gauge railway in Ireland.

History

The Finn Valley Railway had reached Stranorlar in 1863. The West Donegal Railway Company was incorporated by an act of July 1879 to extend the Finn Valley Railway line south west to Donegal, a distance of 18 miles in length.

Although nominally a separate company, the chairman was James Hewitt, 4th Viscount Lifford, who was also chairman of the Finn Valley Railway. The economic prospects for the line were not substantial so the decision was taken to build the line to  narrow gauge.

Construction started on 1 August 1880, and with difficulties in raising finance was opened on 25 April 1882, 4 miles short of Donegal. It took another 7 years before the last 4 miles into Donegal could be constructed, opening in September 1889.

Three tank engines were obtained from Sharp, Stewart and Company, named Alice, Blanche and Lydia.

In 1892, it merged with the Finn Valley Railway into a new company, the Donegal Railway Company.

Surviving vehicles
Carriage no. 1 built in 1882 by the Birmingham Railway Carriage and Wagon Company preserved at the Ulster Folk and Transport Museum, Cultra, County Down.

Gallery

Footnotes

Railway companies established in 1879
Railway companies disestablished in 1892
Great Northern Railway (Ireland)
Defunct railway companies of Ireland
Transport in County Donegal
3 ft gauge railways in Ireland